John Alexander Hart (1 October 1888 – 20 February 1966) was an Australian rules footballer who played with Essendon in the Victorian Football League (VFL).

Notes

External links 

1888 births
1966 deaths
Australian rules footballers from Victoria (Australia)
Essendon Football Club players
Place of birth missing
Place of death missing